Kibithu, also spelled Kibithoo, is a village in Arunachal Pradesh in Anjaw district. It is nearly 70 km north of district headquarter at Hawai, nearly 15 km south of India-China LAC (Kaho), and 40 km west of Diphu Pass near India-China-Myanmar tri-junction. The Lohit River enters India north of Kibithu at Kaho. Nearest air connectivity is 20 km in the south at Walong airstrip in Walong.

History

Many Indian soldiers sacrificed their lives there before slaying approximately 4000 Chinese troops at Namti in the Battle of Walong. The Chinese army still has a sizable deployment of troops opposite Kibithu Tatu, Tithang and at Rongto Chu valley west of Tithang (Rima). The entire Chinese deployment opposite Kibithu is maintained via the Rau transit point. Prior to 1962 Indians were supplying rice and other rations from Kibithu to Rima cooperative for Tibetan villagers.  These rations were ultimately consumed by Chinese People's Liberation Army troops during their deployment before 1962 war.

Transport
The  proposed Mago-Thingbu to Vijaynagar Arunachal Pradesh Frontier Highway along the McMahon Line, (will intersect with the proposed East-West Industrial Corridor Highway) and will pass through this district, alignment map of which can be seen here and here.

India-China Border Personnel Meeting point
It is also one of the five officially agreed Border Personnel Meeting points between the Indian Army and the People's Liberation Army of China for regular consultations and interactions between the two armies, which helps in defusing stand-offs.

See also

 North-East Frontier Agency
 List of people from Arunachal Pradesh
 Religion in Arunachal Pradesh
 Cuisine of Arunachal Pradesh
 List of institutions of higher education in Arunachal Pradesh

References 

Anjaw district
Villages in Anjaw district
Borders of Arunachal Pradesh